The Tamsui Customs Wharf is a wharf in Tamsui District, New Taipei, Taiwan. Until today, this is the only remaining pier in Taiwan built by the Qing Dynasty and being used as naval base today.

History
In 1861, Qing Dynasty established a customhouse in Tamsui and the base became a pier. It began operating on 18 July 1862 as Huwei Port. On 5 August 1895, the custom was closed and handed over to Japan. The custom was then replaced by the custom in Dadaocheng, Taipei in 1916 and being renamed as Customs of Tamsui Branch, Taiwan Government Monopoly in 1920.

Architecture
The wharf was constructed by piling up stones from Mount Guanyin in Wugu and it stretches up to 150 meters long.

Transportation
The wharf is accessible within walking distance north west from Tamsui Station of Taipei Metro.

See also
 List of tourist attractions in Taiwan
 Tamsui Fisherman's Wharf

References

1862 establishments in Taiwan
Buildings and structures in New Taipei
Tourist attractions in New Taipei
Wharves in Taiwan